William Forster may refer to:
William Forster (English politician), MP for Berkshire in 1572–1576.
William Forster (bishop) (died 1635), Church of England bishop of Sodor and Man.
William Forster (mathematician) (fl. 1632–1673), English mathematician
William Forster (cricketer) (1884–1930), Australian cricketer
William Forster (philanthropist) (1784–1854), Quaker preacher and philanthropist.
William Forster (British Army officer) (1798–1870) British Army Officer.
William Forster (Australian politician) (1818–1882), Premier of New South Wales and poet.
William Edward Forster (1818–1886), British statesman, Liberal MP, and Chief Secretary for Ireland.
William Mark Forster (1846–1921), Australian philanthropist.
Henry Forster, 1st Baron Forster of Lepe (1866–1936), also known as Henry William Forster, Governor-General of Australia.
William Forster (judge) (1921–1997), first Chief Justice of the Northern Territory.
William H. Forster (born 1939), U.S. Army lieutenant general.
Bill Forster (footballer), played for Crystal Palace

See also
William Forster Lloyd, British economist
William Foster (disambiguation)